Jhander Khurd is a village in Shaheed Bhagat Singh Nagar district of Punjab State, India. Kalan is Persian language word which means Big and Khurd is Persian word which means small when two villages have same name then it is distinguished as Kalan means Big and Khurd means Small with Village Name. The village is administrated by Sarpanch an elected representative of the village.

Demography 
As of 2011, Jhander Khurd has a total number of 167 houses and population of 823 of which 440 include are males while 383 are females according to the report published by Census India in 2011. The literacy rate of Jhander Khurd is 80.50%, higher than the state average of 75.84%. The population of children under the age of 6 years is 69 which is 8.38% of total population of Jhander Khurd, and child sex ratio is approximately 1226 as compared to Punjab state average of 846.

Most of the people are from Schedule Caste which constitutes 64.28% of total population in Jhander Khurd. The town does not have any Schedule Tribe population so far.

As per the report published by Census India in 2011, 220 people were engaged in work activities out of the total population of Jhander Khurd which includes 205 males and 15 females. According to census survey report 2011, 100% workers describe their work as main work and 0% workers are involved in Marginal activity providing livelihood for less than 6 months.

Education 
Amardeep Singh Shergill Memorial college Mukandpur and Sikh National College Banga are the nearest colleges.

List of schools nearby:
Govt High School, Jhander Kalan
Sat Modern Public School, Mangat Dingrian
Guru Teg Bahadur Model School, Behram
Guru Ram Dass Public School, Cheta
Lovely Public School, Pathlawa

Transport 

See also 
List of villages in India

References

External links 
 Tourism of Punjab
 Census of Punjab
 Locality Based PINCode

Villages in Shaheed Bhagat Singh Nagar district